Euriphene plagiata, the blue-spot nymph, is a butterfly in the family Nymphalidae. It is found in Nigeria, Cameroon, Gabon, Angola and the Democratic Republic of the Congo (from the central part of the country to Mai-Ndombe and Sankuru).

References

Butterflies described in 1897
Euriphene
Butterflies of Africa
Taxa named by Per Olof Christopher Aurivillius